The Samuel Beckett Award was a British award set up in 1983 and, over the next decade, awarded to writers, who in the opinion of a committee of critics, producers and publishers, showed innovation and excellence in writing for the performing arts. The award was established in honour of Irish Nobel Laureate, novelist, playwright and poet Samuel Beckett and in recognition of his distinctive contribution to world theatre and literature.

Award-winning writers included:

 Farrukh Dhondy
 Nick Perry
 Karim Alrawi
 Anne Devlin
 Shirley Gee
 Jim Cartwright
 Ronald Frame
 Kevin Elyot

The Oxford Samuel Beckett Theatre Trust Award was formed in 2003 to support the showcasing of new innovative theatre and is for a company or individual to create a production to be performed at Barbican's Pit Theatre in the City of London.
2003- Dan Hine and Kirsty Housley
2004- Lucy Ellinson, Wendy Hubbard, Mamoru Iriguchi, Sarah Levinsky and Ben Pacey
2005- Gareth Fry, Lu Kemp, Dominic Leclerc, Neil Laidlaw and Chris Dunkley
2006- The Work Theatre Collective
2007- Sophie Hunter, Megan Hefferman, Vanessa Faye-Stanley, Seiriol Cwyfan Davies, Kevin Albi Gravener
2008- Slung Low
2009- Levantes Dance Theatre
2010- You Me Bum Bum Train
2013- Kristin McGuire and Davy McGuire
2014- Dickie Beau
2015- Nigel Barett and Louise Mari
2016- Collectif and then...
2017- Mars.tarrab 
2018- Alan Fielden with Sophie Grodin, Malachy Orozo and Jemima Young (JAMS)
2019- James Baldwin for "Meet the Meat", Ellie Dubois for "Nosedive", Louise Orwin for "CRYCRYKILLKILL"
2022- HighRise Entertainment for "The UK Drill Project", Zoo Co for "Perfect Show for Rachel"

References

External links

British theatre awards
British literary awards
Dramatist and playwright awards
Awards established in 1983
1983 establishments in the United Kingdom